Contending Forces: A Romance Illustrative of Negro Life North and South is the first major novel by Pauline Hopkins, first published in 1900. Contending Forces focuses on African American families in post-Civil War American society. Hopkins, a child of free parents of color, imprinted her "own evasive and unsettling maternal family history, which linked her to the Atlantic slave trade, the West Indies, and the American South" that are described within this text, representing common experiences endured by enslaved and free individuals of this time period.

In writing this text, Hopkins notably employs a romance plot and trope to explore social and racial themes, demonstrating an educated and loving African American family who overcome great racially based obstacles to ultimately achieve both occupational and familial success. Hopkins often notes her appreciation for her race's great achievements, writing for the purpose to uplift her race. Contending Forces was published in 1900 by the Colored Co-operative Publishing Company in Boston, Massachusetts, where majority of the text's setting takes place.

Plot summary

Contending Forces begins with an introduction to Charles Montfort, a successful slave-owner who has moved to North Carolina from Bermuda with his family—sons Charles Jr. and Jesse, and his wife Grace—and his slaves. He plans to slowly free his slaves, against the wishes of the local townspeople. Upon the Montfort family's arrival to North Carolina, rumors are spread that Grace Montfort has African American descent, which Montfort discusses with friend Anson Pollack, the man Montfort had purchased his land from. Anson Pollack, unbeknown to the Montfort family, devises a plan alongside the other townspeople to kill Montfort and destroy his property. Though most of the townspeople are fueled by anger at Montfort's desire to free his slaves, Pollack is also embittered by Grace Montfort's rejection of him. On a beautiful day soon afterward, Pollack, followed by several other men, shoot Montfort dead, and tie Grace Montfort up and whip her. She disappears soon after, and the text implies that she commits suicide by drowning herself in the Pamlico Sound. Pollack takes ownership of the Montfort sons, selling Charles Jr. to a mineralogist. Jesse, sent on an errand by Pollack, escapes and runs away to Boston, Massachusetts, where he arrives at the house of Mr. Whitfield, a "negro in Exeter who could and would help the fugitive". While waiting for Mr. Whitfield, he rocks the cradle of a crying baby, Elizabeth Whitfield, who he marries fifteen years later, and has a large family with.

Several years into the future, the reader is introduced to Ma Smith, the daughter of Jesse Montfort and Elizabeth Whitfield. Ma Smith is a widow with two children of her own: Will and Dora Smith. Their family stays afloat through their lodging house business. The chapter begins with Dora eagerly preparing for a new guest. Will and John Langley, friend of the family and Dora's romantic interest, ask questions about the new tenant, and Dora responds by asserting her belief that Will will fall in love with her. Sappho Clark, the new tenant, arrives, but keeps to herself. Dora and Sappho become quick friends, and Dora is impressed by Sappho's work ethic as a typist. Will soon submits to Dora's prophecy, finding himself thinking of Sappho Clark, even when she is away. Sappho is reserved about her past, but soon becomes more social and involved in her new society by playing the organ at church.

Ma Smith decides to raise funds for the church by hosting a fair, and the local women meet in a sewing circle to make plans for the event, and discuss the role of women in their society, debating the morality of female decisions on virtue and desire. Before the big event, Will and Sappho individually hint their romantic feelings to the other, as Will builds Sappho a fire every day, and she helps mend his socks. To herself, Sappho identifies their love for each other, but acknowledges that she cannot be with him and consequently cannot ever be happy. At the fair, there is a fortune teller act, featuring a little boy named Alphonse, a child with mulatto features. who Sappho takes a great interest in and places on her lap. Dora is caught between childhood friend Dr. Arthur Lewis and Langley. Langley, then, flirts with Sappho, and when she rejects him, he challenges her and implicates that she is Alphonse's mother, to which she quickly refutes his assertion, and excuses herself. The fair is ultimately successful and enjoyable for all those who attend.

Langley's attraction for Sappho increases, and he believes he will be able to convince her to have an affair with him, despite his impending marriage to Dora. Meanwhile, a recent lynching of a black man accused of raping white woman has occurred, sparking a heated debate throughout the town. Langley is up for a position as City Solicitor of the American Colored League, and promises to suppress any outspoken passion at the upcoming indignation meeting. At the meeting, speakers of different political standings voice their opinions regarding the African American presence in their town, and whether political agitation in the North will improve or worsen the state of African American individuals in the South. Speaker Lycurgus Sawyer tells a personal story, as he, a man born to free African Americans, witnessed the murder of his own family. He was saved by Monsieur Beaubean, and became paternally loving of Beaubean's daughter, Mabelle. Mabelle's evil white, half-uncle kidnapped raped her, and deserted her in a whorehouse. After Mabelle was found pregnant, a confrontation occurred between Monsieur Beaubean and the half-uncle, which lead to the burning down of the Beaubean household, killing all but Sawyer and Mabelle. Sawyer took Mabelle to a convent, where he is told she died in childbirth, to his devastation. Sawyer argues for the possibility for peace, but the necessity of justice. During this emotional reflecting, Sappho faints, and is taken outside, as noticed by Langley. After Sawyer's speech, Will argues that African Americans are fit for higher education, and should pursue better occupations. He points out that lynching is common and justified by slight suspicion of African American violence, whereas white violence against African Americans invokes no punishment or consequence. The audience is deeply touched by Will's speech.

Langley visits the fortune teller from the fair, and hears Sappho leaving her, addressing her as "Aunt Sally." The fortune teller reveals that Langley will have a bleak future, much to his dismay. At the Canterbury Club Dinner, Will is seated next to Mr. Withington, who is searching for a better understanding of the race conflict. The men discuss the conflict further, and Withington promises to do what he can. He gives Langley his business card, which reads: Charles Montfort, Withington. On Easter Sunday, Langley is infatuated with Sappho and ignores Dora. However, Sappho and Will meet in the garden and declare their love for the other. They decide to wait to tell their family of their engagement the following day. Sappho's bliss is soon disrupted, however, when Langley enters Sappho's room uninvited and reveals that he knows she is truly Mabelle Beaubean, and threatens to tell Will her past unless she marries him. Sappho is distraught, but refuses Langley, and leaves Ma Smith's home during the night. When Will awakens the next morning, excited to share the news of his engagement, Dora shows him the letter Sappho left behind, explaining the truth of her past, and Langley's threat. Dora decides to break her engagement to Langley, and Will leaves to confront him, which turns into a physical fight, and the end of their friendship.

Sappho goes to her Aunt Sally and declares that she wants to take back her son Alphonse and begin a new life as his mother. With Alphonse, she leaves for New Orleans and is taken in by a convent. Her identity is protected as Sappho Clark, and she is accepted as a young widow. While Alphonse stays at the orphanage, Sappho works as a governess for two years. Her employer, widower Monsieur Louis, asks her to marry him, and she asks for two weeks to make up her mind. Meanwhile, Will graduates from Harvard and Dora is married to Dr. Arthur Lewis. Charles Montfort-Withington visits Will, and discovers his connection to the family, revealing that he tried to find Jesse, but was unsuccessful. It is also revealed that Anson Pollack is a descendant of John Langley. The Supreme Court identifies Ma Smith as the last representative of the heirs of Jesse Montfort, awarding her $150,000.

Will visits Dora in New Orleans, and they attend Easter Sunday at the same convent Sappho coincidentally arrived at years ago. Will recognizes Alphonse, and rushes to find Sappho, which he does. They reunite, and he forgives her for running off and not trusting in him to accept her. Monsieur Louis, though disappointed that Sappho will not marry him, understands and is happy for the couple. Langley's future is revealed, as he dies alone, matching the fortune told to him by Aunt Sally. The text ends with the Smith family, including Sappho and Alphonse, happy together.

Feminist themes
Sappho Clark, protagonist of Contending Forces, has often been discussed as a literary representative of feminism.

A victim of sexual abuse, Sappho Clark redefines what is means to be a mother, as she is separated from her illegitimate child for a large portion of the text. Allison Berg notes that Hopkins' "intervention in these ideologies [of what nineteenth-century, white notions of True Womanhood is] thus involves not only telling the ‘real' story of black mothers . . . but also interrogating contemporary racial and sexual discourses that contributed to black women's subjugation and limited their efficacy and mothers," pointing out the intersectionality of Hopkins' embedded feminism, as she describes the problems of discrimination against gender, class, race, and so forth. Berg argues that through Hopkins' reconstruction of "motherhood," she also affirms Sappho's right to motherhood outside of marriage, opening possibilities for women's rights during a patriarchal, racially unsettling time.

Hopkins' decision to design an ending in which Sappho is able to overcome the rape of her half-uncle and threats by John Langley, and to marry Will Smith while reclaiming her son, has also allowed several scholars to view this novel as a pro-feminist text. Sappho is often read as a Christ-figure: she is forgiven, redeemed, and reborn by her endured hardships. Hopkins' allusions to religion within the text has arguably allowed readers to see the biblically cited injustice in judging Sappho, and others like Sappho, for her forced "impurity" without understanding the cause of this sexual "impurity." Though Sappho, as an African American woman, is vulnerable to her society as a result of her race and gender, she asserts black female power, providing an example for the feminist discussion of critical race theory and intersectionality in the novel.

Modern reception
Contending Forces garnered mixed reviews from modern readers, especially in regard to the issues with gender embedded within the novel. Though Sappho Clark is widely regarded as a feminist character, the debate surrounding her position as a victim has led some to question the feminist nature of the text. Poet Gwendolyn Brooks wrote that Hopkins' novels featured "a brain-washed slave [who] reveres the modes and idolatries of the master".

While there are conflicting interpretations of the treatment of women in the text, contemporary critics often praise Hopkins' ability to "raise the stigma" of her race. For example, Houston Baker writes that the novel "insists on the rights of Black Americans to be fully integrated subjects, politically and economically", establishing a complex discussion on the rights and abilities of African Americans, particularly African American women, in post-Civil War society.

The novel has also been regarded as a representation of the necessary political reaction to the treatment of African Americans. Thomas Cassidy calls the novel a polemic, arguing that "it has been constructed to convince its readers that the widespread lynching and raping of black people around the turn of the century constituted political terrorism which had to be combated by political means".

References 

1900 American novels
African-American novels
Novels set in Boston